Sabalia jacksoni is a moth in the family Brahmaeidae (older classifications placed it in Lemoniidae). It was described by Emily Mary Bowdler Sharpe in 1890.

References

Brahmaeidae
Moths described in 1890